PRT may refer to:

Music
Poor Righteous Teachers, a hip hop group
PRT Records, a record label

Organizations
Prison Reform Trust, UK campaigning charity
Provincial Reconstruction Team of the US government
Puerto Rico Telephone Company
Pittsburgh Regional Transit, public transportation provider in the US
PRT Company Limited, formerly Prime Media Group, a former Australian media company

Politics
Partido Revolucionario de los Trabajadores, political parties in Argentina, Nicaragua and Peru: 
Workers' Revolutionary Party (Argentina)
Workers' Revolutionary Party (Nicaragua)
Workers' Revolutionary Party (Peru)
Partido Revolucionário dos Trabalhadores, a political party in Portugal
Partido Revolucionario de los y las Trabajadores, a political party in Mexico

Other
Power Rangers Turbo, fifth season of American television series Power Rangers
Personal rapid transit, a type of transit system
Pivotal response therapy for autism
Platinum resistance thermometer
Portugal, the three letter ISO 3166-1 code for Portugal
Prerequisite Tree, a thinking process in the Theory of Constraints
Preterite, grammatical term
Precomputed Radiance Transfer, a technique for computer graphics
Petroleum Revenue Tax, a direct tax on petroleum "super-profits" in the United Kingdom
Provincial Reconstruction Team in Afghanistan, ISAF military groups tasked with improving security, extending the authority of the Afghan government, and facilitating reconstruction
Parahuman-Response Team, a police organization tasked to deal with capes in the web serial Worm